Ciotti is an Italian surname. It is also present in Megleno-Romanian. Notable people with the surname include:

Dragutin Ciotti (1905—1974), Croatian gymnast
Dumitru Ciotti (1882/1885–1974), Megleno-Romanian activist, editor and schoolteacher
Éric Ciotti (born 1965), French politician
Giulio Ciotti (born 1976), Italian high jumper
Luigi Ciotti (born 1945), Italian Roman Catholic priest
Nicholas Ciotti (1944–2003), American mobster
Nicola Ciotti (born 1976), Italian high jumper
Pietro Ciotti (born 1999), Italian footballer
Roberto Ciotti (1953–2013), Italian musician and composer

Italian-language surnames
Megleno-Romanian-language surnames